Curtis Marquis Terry (born October 6, 1996) is an American professional baseball first baseman in the Baltimore Orioles organization. He has played in Major League Baseball (MLB) for the Texas Rangers. He made his MLB debut in 2021.

Amateur career
Terry attended Archer High School in Lawrenceville, Georgia. He committed to play college baseball at Georgia State University. He was drafted by the Texas Rangers in the 13th round of the 2015 MLB draft. He signed with Texas for a $100,000 signing bonus.

Professional career

Texas Rangers
Terry spent his debut season of 2015 with the AZL Rangers of the Rookie-level Arizona League, hitting .260/.317/.394/.710 with 1 home run and 24 RBI. He split the 2016 season between the AZL Rangers and the  Spokane Indians of the Class A Short Season Northwest League, hitting a combined .285/.333/.488/.822 with 5 home runs and 26 RBI. Terry spent the 2017 and 2018 seasons back with Spokane. He hit .258/.303/.467/.771 with 12 home runs and 30 RBI in 2017, and .337/.434/.606/1.040 with 15 home runs and 60 RBI in 2018. Terry was named the 2018 Northwest League MVP.

Terry made his full-season debut in 2019, spitting the season between the Hickory Crawdads of the Class A South Atlantic League and the Down East Wood Ducks of the Class A-Advanced Carolina League. He combined to hit .293/.362/.537/.899 with 25 home runs and 80 RBI between the two levels. He was named the Rangers 2019 minor league player of the year. Terry did not play in 2020 due to the cancellation of the Minor League Baseball season because of the COVID-19 pandemic. He was assigned to the Round Rock Express of the Triple-A West for the 2021 minor league season, hitting .275/.349/.533/.882 with 22 home runs and 75 RBI. Terry hit for the cycle with Round Rock on June 18, 2021. On July 23, 2021, Terry's contract was selected and he was promoted to the major leagues for the first time. He made his MLB debut that night, as the designated hitter against the Houston Astros. After starting his career 0–20, Terry recorded his first career hit on August 2, a double off Chris Rodriguez. Terry hit just .089 with 1 RBI over 48 plate appearances for Texas in 2021. On November 5, 2021, Terry was outrighted off the roster and became a free agent.

Minnesota Twins
On November 30, 2021, Terry signed a minor league contract with the Minnesota Twins. Terry played in 80 games for the Triple-A St. Paul Saints, slashing .250/.348/.429 with 10 home runs and 32 RBI. He was released on August 10, 2022.

Baltimore Orioles
On January 27, 2023, Terry signed a minor league contract with the Baltimore Orioles organization.

References

External links

1996 births
Living people
People from Snellville, Georgia
Baseball players from Georgia (U.S. state)
African-American baseball players
Major League Baseball first basemen
Texas Rangers players
Arizona League Rangers players
Spokane Indians players
Hickory Crawdads players
Down East Wood Ducks players
Round Rock Express players
21st-century African-American sportspeople
St. Paul Saints players